Zharkovsky (masculine), Zharkovskaya (feminine), or Zharkovskoye (neuter) may refer to:
Zharkovsky District, a district of Tver Oblast, Russia
Zharkovsky (urban-type settlement), an urban locality (an urban-type settlement) in Tver Oblast, Russia